Shimian County is both the southernmost and westernmost county in the prefecture-level city of Ya'an, Sichuan Province, China.  The county seat, Miancheng Subdistrict, and the neighboring town, Xinmian, are often together referred to as Shimian.  As of the 2010 census, Shimian County has a population of 123,600.  The G5 Beijing–Kunming Expressway now passes through Shimian along the route between Kunming and Chengdu.

The county is located at the eastern edge of the Hengduan Mountains and surrounds the Dadu River.  The mountain ranges in Shimian County consist of the Daxue Mountains in the west, the Xiaoxiang Range to the southeast, and the Daxiang Range to the northeast.

Climate

Notable people
Lai Ning, a teenager celebrated as a martyr after his death fighting a wildfire.

References

County-level divisions of Sichuan